An ad exchange is a technology platform that facilitates the buying and selling of media advertising inventory from multiple ad networks. Prices for the inventory are determined through real-time bidding (RTB). The approach is technology-driven as opposed to the historical approach of negotiating price on media inventory. This represents a field beyond ad networks as defined by the Interactive Advertising Bureau (IAB), and by advertising trade publications.

Ad exchanges
Notable ad exchanges include: 
 AppLovin (which recently acquired MoPub)
 FreeWheel (owned by Comcast)
 Google Ad Manager (also known as Google Authorized Buyers, formerly known as AdX, and now part of Google Ad Manager)
 Hivestack
 Index Exchange
 InMobi
 Magnite Inc (formed by the combination of Rubicon Project, SpotX, and Telaria)
 OpenX (company)
 Pubmatic
 Smaato
 Xandr (formerly AT&T AdWorks which bought AppNexus, now owned by Microsoft)
 Yahoo (formerly AOL, Brightroll, OATH and other entities rolled into the Yahoo brand)

See also
Demand-side platform
Online advertising
Supply-side platform
Header bidding

References

Online advertising